Cree Summer Francks (born July 7, 1969) is an American-Canadian voice actress and singer.

She has worked extensively in animation, voicing long-running characters such as Susie Carmichael in Rugrats and Elmyra Duff in Tiny Toon Adventures and related media.

In live-action, she is known for her role as Winifred "Freddie" Brooks in the NBC sitcom A Different World from 1987 to 1993.

Early life
Summer was born in Los Angeles on July 7, 1969, and grew up in Saskatchewan and  Toronto, Canada. Her parents are Canadian actor Don Francks, and Lili Clark, an African American from North Richmond, California. She and her family also traveled and lived around British Columbia during her childhood, and she started public school at the age of nine in Toronto. Her brother, Rainbow Sun Francks, is an actor and a former MuchMusic VJ.

Career

Acting
Summer's acting career began in 1983 when she was cast as Penny in the first season of the original version of Inspector Gadget. Her unique, throaty voice was instantly recognizable to viewers, as well as casting agents, who began frequently casting her in animated programs. Many of these were part of cult franchises, like The Care Bears Movie (1985) and Ewoks (1985, part of the Star Wars franchise).

In 1988, Summer was cast as the freespirited Winifred "Freddie" Brooks in The Cosby Show spin-off A Different World. She remained a regular cast member of the show from 1988 through its end in 1993.

During the run of A Different World, Summer continued working in voice acting. She was cast in the short-lived television series Sweet Justice in 1994 until its cancellation in 1995. In the fall of that same year, Summer and her A Different World co-star Jenifer Lewis starred in the prime time drama Courthouse, which was cancelled two months after it premiered. Apart from guest appearances on other live-action television shows such as Living Single, Better Things, and The Fresh Prince of Bel-Air, Summer's professional work since has mostly been limited to voice acting. 

She appeared as herself in the final episode of Donald Glover’s series Atlanta, following a voice cameo in the first season episode "B.A.N.". At the start of the third season of A Different World in 1988, the cartoon series The Real Ghostbusters episodes were expanded from their original half-hour format to an hour. The show was changed to be more youthful. Episodes had a lighter tone designed to be less serious and frightening. In these lighter episodes, she voiced Chilly Cooper, the neighborhood ice-cream woman and innocent love interest of Slimer.

Summer voiced over 101 animated characters between 1983 and 2006. These have spanned video games, cartoon television series, animated films and commercials. Among her most famous roles was in Inspector Gadget (Season 1) as Penny (a role she reprised in the Robot Chicken episode "Adoption's an Option"), WB's Tiny Toon Adventures (1990) as Elmyra Duff (which she reprised for Pinky, Elmyra & the Brain) and Mary Melody, Aka Pella in WB's Histeria!, Susie Carmichael in Nickelodeon's Rugrats and its spin-off All Grown Up!, Cleo the Poodle in PBS Kids' Clifford the Big Red Dog, Miranda from Nickelodeon's As Told by Ginger, Foxxy Love in Drawn Together, Dulcy the Dragon in Sonic the Hedgehog, Valerie Gray in Nickelodeon's Danny Phantom, Numbuh 5 and Cree Lincoln in Cartoon Network's Codename: Kids Next Door, Penelope in Barbie as Rapunzel, octogenarian villain Granny May on WordGirl, Tiff from Nickelodeon's My Life as a Teenage Robot, and Blackarachnia in Transformers: Animated. She also voiced Princess 'Kida' Kidagakash for the franchise of Disney's Atlantis: The Lost Empire. Summer has regarded the character of Kida as one of her favorite roles and even considers the character among the official Disney Princess line. She also played a role in Scooby Doo Mystery Incorporated as Lady Marmalad in the episode "The Haunting". In December 2016, Summer reprised her role as Penny from Inspector Gadget in an episode of the web-series, Nostalgia Critic. She later joined SpongeBob SquarePants spinoff The Patrick Star Show, where she voices Patrick Star's mother plus Squidward Tentacles' grandmother.

Video game voice acting
She performed voice over for the games Baldur's Gate: Dark Alliance, Black, as well as Tony Hawk's American Wasteland. She voiced Auriel in Diablo 3, and reprised the role for Heroes of the Storm. She was also the voice of Tandi in Fallout and First Citizen Lynette in Fallout 2, Tatjana in Arc the Lad: Twilight of the Spirits, Lady Belgemine, Young Tidus and additional voice-overs in Final Fantasy X, Lenne/Calli in Final Fantasy X-2, Storm in Marvel Super Hero Squad, Cynder in The Legend of Spyro: A New Beginning, Magma in X-Men Legends, and the Inca Princess Micay in Pitfall: The Lost Expedition. She voices Medusa in the game Kid Icarus: Uprising for the Nintendo 3DS. She voiced Catalina Thorn, the leader of the Cell in Crackdown 2. She had a small role in Mass Effect. She also did miscellaneous voices in World of Warcraft: Mists of Pandaria. She reprised her voice of She-Hulk in Marvel Super Hero Squad: The Infinity Gauntlet. She also voiced Kit Brinny in the introduction video for the MMORPG Wildstar. She provides the voice of vampire derby girl Roller Brawl in the Skylanders series. She has also voiced Professor Penelope Young, a minor character original in Batman: Arkham Asylum.

Music career 
Summer has sung since an early age and joined her first band at 13. In 1985, she recorded the theme song for OWL/TV. In 1990, she sang background vocals on two tracks for fellow A Different World cast member Jasmine Guy's self-titled LP. In 1993 she released an album (as lead singer) with her band Subject to Change. Capitol Records did not officially release the album because of creative differences; the records that were produced were distributed as promotions and are considered a rarity. The band, with a strong political message and rock-soul fusion sound, remained popular as a co-headlining act with other performers. In 1999, Summer released her solo album Street Faërie produced by and featuring guest artist (and friend) Lenny Kravitz, with the album a moderate success. Although Summer toured as Kravitz's opening act, her label dropped her and a planned spot with Lilith Fair was canceled. The label continued to promote the album, however, sending out a four-track sampler to radio and issuing remix singles of the track "Revelation Sunshine" in Europe, with a special single specifically for Austria.

Summer recorded a song titled "Savior Self" for which she directed a music video co-starring Zoë Kravitz, daughter of actor Lisa Bonet and rocker Lenny Kravitz. The video was screened online, but the track was never made available commercially, nor was it distributed to the radio.

A number of Summer's portrayed characters (animated or otherwise) are singers or sing songs within the soundtrack of a show. The character of Susie in All Grown Up! was portrayed as a singer with real talent, allowing Summer to sing in the role. Summer also sings the opening theme song for All Grown Up!. The character of Foxxy Love in Drawn Together was a singer, with songs like "La-La-La-La-Labia" and "Crashy Smashy", Numbuh 5 from Codename: Kids Next Door sang a lullaby to lull babies to sleep. Elmyra Duff sang many times on Tiny Toon Adventures. She co-performed lead vocals in the song "Cool Kitty" with Tara Strong, which accompanied a cartoon called Class of 3000, directed and written for Cartoon Network by André 3000. She provided the voice of a recurring pomegranate singer in The High Fructose Adventures of Annoying Orange, who usually sang during montage sequences. Her character Priscilla on Sheriff Callie's Wild West sings many times, as well.

In 2008, Summer appeared on The Frank Zappa AAAFNRAAA Birthday Bundle, performing a cover of Zappa's song "Dirty Love" with Dweezil Zappa on guitar and backup vocals by Ahmet Zappa, produced by Linda Perry.

Musical influences
Summer's musical influences include Frank Zappa, Al Green and Dinah Washington.

Personal life 
Summer was married to producer Angelo Pullen for nearly 10 years; they officially announced the dissolution of their marriage in May 2022. The couple have two daughters: Brave Littlewing, born in 2011, and Hero Peregrine (named after the peregrine falcon) born in 2013. Summer also has a younger brother, Rainbow Sun Francks, a Canadian actor and songwriter who was also an on-air personality at Much, a Canadian music video and variety television channel.

Filmography

Animated film roles

Animation roles

Live-action film roles

Live-action television series roles

Video games

Discography

Albums 
 Appeared on the Juno Award-nominated album I Lost My Pet Lizard (1979)
 Appeared as Debbie in the Canadian Sesame Street album Big Bird & Oscar the Grouch: Camping in Canada (1981)
 Womb Amnesia – (1993) (with her band Subject to Change)
 Street Faërie – (1999)

Singles 
 "Revelation Sunshine"

References

External links 
 
 
 

1969 births
Living people
Actresses from Los Angeles
Actresses from Saskatchewan
Actresses from Toronto
American child actresses
American expatriate musicians in Canada
American soul singers
American television actresses
American video game actresses
American voice actresses
Black Canadian actresses
Canadian emigrants to the United States
Canadian people of African-American descent
Canadian soul singers
Canadian women singer-songwriters
Indigenous rights activists
Musicians from Saskatchewan
Musicians from Toronto
Native Americans' rights activists
20th-century American actresses
21st-century American actresses
20th-century Black Canadian women singers
21st-century Black Canadian women singers
20th-century Canadian actresses
21st-century Canadian actresses